The eighth season of the American television series The Masked Singer premiered on Fox on September 21, and concluded on November 30, 2022. Amber Riley was crowned the winner as the "Harp" while Wilson Phillips were crowned the runners-up as "Lambs". The season was followed by a Christmas special, which aired on December 7, 2022.

Panelists and host 

Nick Cannon, singer-songwriter Robin Thicke, television and radio personality Jenny McCarthy Wahlberg, actor and comedian Ken Jeong, and recording artist Nicole Scherzinger all return as host and panelists. Jeong did not appear in the seventh episode as he had tested positive for COVID-19 at the time.

The first episode featured Will Arnett who appeared in a cameo before the first king/queen crowning, the second episode included season one runner-up Donny Osmond as a guest panelist, with the Blue Man Group and Carrot Top as additional guests, the third episode featured Jodie Sweetin and season one contestant Tori Spelling as additional guests, the fourth episode featured Andrew Lloyd Webber as a guest panelist, the fifth episode featured The Muppets, with Miss Piggy as a guest panelist, as well as season five contestant Kermit the Frog, Animal, Fozzie Bear, and others appearing as additional guests, the sixth episode featured Tag Team, Danielle Fishel, and Lance Bass as additional guests, the seventh episode featured Leslie Jordan and Joel McHale (filling in for an absent Jeong) as guest panelists, with Sheila E. as an additional guest, and the eighth episode featured Jon Lovitz and season three contestant Drew Carey as additional guests.

Leslie Jordan, a guest panelist in the seventh episode aired on November 9, was killed in a car accident on October 24, 2022, marking the first posthumous appearance in the series. The episode was dedicated in his honor, including a tribute at the beginning and end of the episode.

Production 
On May 16, 2022, it was announced that Fox renewed the series for an eighth season, prior to the airing of the seventh season's finale on May 18. On June 6, 2022, it was announced that the season would premiere on September 21.

The formatting for the season sees three contestants battle in each episode, with one eliminated mid-show and taken to the VIP section while the other two battle out. A king/queen is crowned at the end of each episode who then moves on to the following episode, while the other in the top two gets eliminated. The season also includes themed nights for the first time, including "Vegas Night", "Comedy Roast", "Hall Of Fame", "Muppets Night", "Andrew Lloyd Webber Night", "TV Themes", "'90s Night", "Thanksgiving", and "Fright Night".

Numerous episodes during the season were rescheduled due to the Major League Baseball playoffs. The first took place on October 12, when game two of the NLDS between the Philadelphia Phillies and the Atlanta Braves suffered a rain delay with game play resuming during primetime on the east coast. Consequently, the airing of the Andrew Lloyd Webber episode was pre-empted nationally. However, it aired on CTV in Canada as scheduled. The season was further delayed by the World Series, when a necessary game five took out another air date (November 2). Following a rainout of game three, the remainder of the World Series schedule was pushed back a day, placing a potential game seven on the next scheduled air date (November 6), though only six games were played in the World Series.

The "Masked Singer Seasonal Sing-A-Long Spectacular!" holiday special was dedicated to the memory of actor Kirstie Alley, who portrayed "Baby Mammoth" in the previous season. Alley died of colon cancer on December 5, 2022.

Contestants 
Following her death, it was reported that actor Anne Heche had been in negotiations to participate in the season, though it is unclear how far she was in the process.

The season features 22 contestants, the most number of contestants on any American season of The Masked Singer. The contestants in this season are reported to have a combined 42 books, 32 Grammy nominations, 16 Emmy wins, 10 Teen Choice Awards, eight gold albums, five stars on the Hollywood Walk of Fame, and four Golden Globe nominations.

Episodes

Week 1 (September 21)

 After being unmasked, Idle sang his signature song "Always Look on the Bright Side of Life" from Life of Brian.

Week 2 (September 28) - "Vegas Night"
 Guest performance: Guest panelist Donny Osmond performs a medley of "The Greatest Show" from The Greatest Showman and "Viva Las Vegas" by Elvis Presley

 After being unmasked, Jordan performed his hit "This Is How We Do It" as his encore performance.

Week 3 (October 5) - "TV Theme Night"
Guest performance: Panelist Robin Thicke performs "As Long As We Got Each Other" by B. J. Thomas (from Growing Pains)

 After their unmasking, Lookinland, Williams, and Knight sang "It's a Sunshine Day" from The Brady Bunch.

Week 4 (October 19) - "Andrew Lloyd Webber Night"
Guest performance: Panelist Nicole Scherzinger performs "Memory" from Cats

 After being unmasked, Gaynor sang her signature song "I Will Survive" as her encore performance.

Week 5 (October 26) - "Muppets Night"
Guest performance: Kermit the Frog with Nick Cannon and the panelists perform "Rainbow Connection"

Week 6 (November 6 and 9) - "90s Night" and "Hall of Fame Night"
Guest performance: Tag Team performs "Whoomp! (There It Is)"

 Guest performance: Panelist Nicole Scherzinger performs "Fame" by Irene Cara

 After being unmasked, Clinton sang his signature song "Give Up the Funk (Tear the Roof Off the Sucker)" as his encore performance.

Week 7 (November 16) - "Comedy Roast Night"

Week 8 (November 23 and 24) - "Fright Night" and "Battle of the Semi Finals"

 After being unmasked, Parker sang his signature song "Ghostbusters" as his encore performance.

Week 9 (November 30) - "Two Hour Epic Finale"

 After being unmasked, Wilson Phillips sang their signature song "Hold On" as their encore performance.

Ratings

Notes

References 

2022 American television seasons
The Masked Singer (American TV series)